European Parliament elections were held in Greece for the first time on 18 October 1981. The rest of the European Community voted in 1979 before Greece became a member state. Greece was allocated 24 seats in the Parliament.

Results

Elected MEPs
List of members of the European Parliament for Greece, 1981–1984

References

Greece
European Parliament elections in Greece
1980s in Greek politics
European
Greece